The 15th edition of the LOS40 Music Awards was held on December 5, 2020. The ceremony was presented primarily from Madrid, Spain, but held without a live audience due to the ongoing COVID-19 pandemic. It featured performances from many parts of the world following the international protocole against COVID-19 propagation.

Performing artists
The full lineup of performers was announced on November 24, 2020.

Notes
 Although Aitana was announced as a performer, she couldn't attend the ceremony as she tested positive for COVID-19. Aitana's performance was pre-recorded days before she tested positive.
 Morat could not be at the award ceremony due to travel related issues.

Awards and nominations
The nominees were announced on a special broadcast on October 15, 2020.

References

2020 music awards